Fifth planet may refer to:
 Jupiter, fifth planet from the Sun in our Solar System
 Fifth planet (hypothetical), any of various hypothetical planets thought to have existed
 Fifth Planet (novel), science fiction novel by Fred and Geoffrey Hoyle
 Planet V, 2002 scientific proposal for a destroyed fifth planet
 Mars, fifth planet from Earth in the Ptolemaic geocentric model
 Ceres (dwarf planet), dwarf planet between Mars and Jupiter in the asteroid belt

See also